The Galilee Eskimos is a 2006 comedy-drama film directed, produced and co-written by Jonathan Paz. It was filmed on location at Kibbutz Yehiam and premiered at the Haifa International Film Festival in September 2006.

Plot
When the bank forecloses on the property of an isolated and financially troubled kibbutz in Galilee, Israel, most of the residents gather their belongings and abandon the community before the bailiffs arrive. In their haste to depart, however, they neglect to bring with them a dozen senior citizens who now are forced to fend for themselves as they attempt to oppose the construction of a luxury spa and casino and save their kibbutz single-handedly. In the process, they rediscover the pioneering spirit they felt when the kibbutz was first established.

Cast
 as Durkeh
Mosko Alkalai as Mundek
Dina Doron as Fanny
 as Reznik
Shimon Yisraeli as Yulek
Ruth Sagall as Chesha
 as Yoske
Levana Finkelstein as Miraleh
 as Faigeh
Shmuel Shilo as Faybel
 as Nyeshka
Ilan Toren as Berkeh
Dvir Benedek as Spielman
Adi Gilat as Limor
Ofer Zohar as Azulay

Production
Director Jonathan Paz grew up on Kibbutz Mizra in northern Israel, where he was a member until 1971. In a 2009 interview, Paz stated: “The idea for the film came to me some seven years ago, in the final year of my dear mother's life. On one of my visits to the kibbutz (which, incidentally, treated her and her contemporaries in a wonderful way, as do, to the best of my knowledge, all of the other kibbutzim), we spoke of Globalization, insensitive Capitalism and the poor state of the kibbutzim. Many of the kibbutzim had begun the process of Privatization (no more Communal Living or ‘Each contributes according to his abilities and receives according to his needs’… no more equality and cooperation, only ‘Differential Wages’ etc.). I spoke to my mother about loneliness and the fact that life passes so quickly (even though my mother lived to the ripe old-age of 97, alert and lucid to the end). I asked her, ‘Mother, which period of your life do you miss the most?’ She answered without any hesitation, 'I would like to go back to the time when we founded the kibbutz.’ I knew right then that I had a story! There was a film to be made!”

The Galilee Eskimos pays tribute to the founding generation of kibbutzniks and Paz's respect for the egalitarian values and mutual help their lives embodied. In the same 2009 interview, Paz emphasized that "I made my film with a great deal of love, nostalgia, longing and homage to those people who founded the kibbutz. I really admire and love those people."

References

External links
 
 

2000s Hebrew-language films
2006 films
Films about the kibbutz
Films about old age
2006 comedy-drama films
Israeli comedy-drama films